Tatjana Irrah, also known as Tatjana Irah and Tatjana Yrrah, (born Olga Bernhardt, 15 May 1892 - 13 January 1949), was a German film  and stage actress who appeared in German and American silent films. Her film career began in Germany in 1913. Around 1916, she moved to the United States due to the film shortage in her home country.

Her performance in Die Grosstadtluft was reviewed as "the one characterization in the play that was done exceptionally well". She played a main role in the comedy film Der oder Der (One or the Other).

In 1920 her first American film was released.

Filmography
The War Sofa (1914), directed by William Karfiol (original title: Das Kriegssofa)
The Dancer (1915 film)
Das Unheimliche Zimmer (The Uncanny Room) (1915), as Miss Lyons
Und wandern sollst During ruhelos.. (And you still wander restlessly) (1915)
Ein Blatt Paper (1916)
Your Dearest Enemy (1916)
One or the Other (1919)
The Red Poster (1920), as Marion Diabelli
Man and Woman (1920), as The Duchess
Miss 139  (1922), as The squirrel
Ballettratten (1925), as Prima Ballerina Bellini

References

External links 

 
 
 The Amazing Lovers

German silent film actresses
American silent film actresses

Year of birth missing (living people)
Living people